The Foxburg Bridge carries PA 58 over the Allegheny River between Armstrong County, Pennsylvania and Clarion County, Pennsylvania in Foxburg, Pennsylvania, USA.

History
The new bridge was completed alongside the old Foxburg Bridge which was demolished to allow the pedestrian walkway to be added. The project began in 2007 and was due to end in 2009 but the bridge opened to traffic ahead of schedule. The cost of the project was $10.1 million.

See also
List of crossings of the Allegheny River

References

Bridges over the Allegheny River
Bridges in Armstrong County, Pennsylvania
Bridges in Clarion County, Pennsylvania
Road bridges in Pennsylvania
Steel bridges in the United States
Girder bridges in the United States